Lumia may refer to:

 Lumia (citrus), the pear lemon
 Lumia art, art created from light
 Guajona or Lumia, a creature of Cantabrian mythology
 Microsoft Lumia, a line of smartphones by Nokia and Microsoft Mobile

People
 Giuseppe Lumia (born 1960), Italian politician
 James Lumia, criminal, see Nicola Impastato 
 Guy Lumia, concertmaster for the album Silver 'n Strings Play the Music of the Spheres

See also
 Lumina (disambiguation)